Tanacetum corymbosum is a species of flowering plant belonging to the family Asteraceae.

Its native range is Europe to Western Siberia and Turkey.

References

corymbosum